Rahu Ketu is a 1978 Bollywood action film directed by B. R. Ishara. It stars Premnath, Pran in title roles, with Shashi Kapoor, Rekha, Bindu, Aruna Irani in pivotal roles. The music was composed by Kalyanji-Anandji.

Cast
Shashi Kapoor as CBI Officer Ravi Kapoor 
Rekha as Tulsi 
Premnath as Collector Nath / Rahu
Pran as Karim / Ketu
Bindu as Sheela 
Aruna Irani as Rani 
Kamini Kaushal as Chandramukhi  
Asit Sen as Radhe Shyam 
Jayshree T. as Dancer / Singer 
Leena Das as Dancer / Singer
Alka as Rita    
Kanhaiyalal as Ram Prasad 
Jagdish Raj as Inspector Thakur
Raj Mehra as Ravi's Boss 
Ram Mohan as Ranjeet    
Shivraj as Mohandas

Songs
Lyrics: Verma Malik

External links
 

1978 films
1970s Hindi-language films
1978 action films
Films scored by Kalyanji Anandji
Films directed by B. R. Ishara
Indian action films
Hindi-language action films